Van Lennep may refer to:

 Aernout van Lennep (1898–1974), Dutch equestrian
 Christiaan van Lennep (1887–1955), Dutch tennis player
 Gijs van Lennep (born 1942), Dutch racing driver
 Jacob van Lennep (1802–1868), Dutch poet
 Mies Boissevain-van Lennep (1896–1965), Dutch resistance hero
 Mary E. Van Lennep (1821–1844), American missionary, school founder, memoirist
 Norman van Lennep (1872–1897), Dutch chess master

Surnames of Dutch origin